Obory is a municipality and village in Příbram District in the Central Bohemian Region of the Czech Republic. It has about 300 inhabitants.

Administrative parts
The hamlet of Vápenice is an administrative part of Obory.

References

Villages in Příbram District